Sendy Rleal Aquino (born June 21, 1980 in San Pedro de Macorís, Dominican Republic) is a former Major League Baseball pitcher. He pitched as a reliever for the Baltimore Orioles in 2006.

In 2007, Rleal pitched in the minor leagues for the Class AA Bowie Baysox. In 2008, Rleal played with the Lancaster Barnstormers of the Atlantic League. He pitched for the Newark Bears of the Atlantic League in 2009. He next pitched for the Petroleros de Minatitlan of the Mexican League in 2011. In May 2012 Rleal pitched for Goyang Wonders in the South Korean Futures League.

References

External links

1980 births
Living people
Baltimore Orioles players
Dominican Republic expatriate baseball players in the United States
Lancaster Barnstormers players

Major League Baseball pitchers
Major League Baseball players from the Dominican Republic
Newark Bears players
Águilas del Zulia players
Dominican Republic expatriate baseball players in Venezuela
Bluefield Orioles players
Bowie Baysox players
Delmarva Shorebirds players
Estrellas Orientales players
Frederick Keys players
Ottawa Lynx players
Dominican Republic expatriate baseball players in Canada
Petroleros de Minatitlán players
Dominican Republic expatriate baseball players in Mexico
Sinon Bulls players
Dominican Republic expatriate baseball players in Taiwan
Toros del Este players
Dominican Republic expatriate baseball players in South Korea